Trachyuropodidae is a family of mites in the order Mesostigmata.

Species

 Capitodiscus Vitzthum, 1931
 Capitodiscus venusta (Berlese, 1884)
 Cephalouropoda Berlese, 1903
 Cephalouropoda berlesiana (Berlese, 1887)
 Crinitodiscus Sellnick, 1931 
 Crinitodiscus beieri (Sellnick, 1931)
 Crinitodiscus pawlowskii Athias-Binche & Bloszyk, 1985
 Crinitodiscus rafalskii Athias-Binche & Bloszyk, 1985
 Phymatodiscus Berlese, 1917
 Phymatodiscus aokii Hiramatsu, 1985
 Phymatodiscus coniferus (Canestrini, 1897)
 Phymatodiscus haradai Hiramatsu, 1985
 Phymatodiscus ignesemovens Hirschmann, 1977
 Phymatodiscus iriomotensis Hiramatsu, 1979
 Phymatodiscus mirabilis Hirschmann, 1977
 Phymatodiscus mirandus (Berlese, 1905)
 Phymatodiscus oculatus Hirschmann, 1977
 Phymatodiscus polyglottis Hirschmann, 1977
 Phymatodiscus titanicus (Berlese, 1905)
 Trachyuropoda Berlese, 1888
 Trachyuropoda ablesi Hirschmann, 1976
 Trachyuropoda alapaducta Hirschmann, 1976
 Trachyuropoda angustioculata Hirschmann, 1976
 Trachyuropoda arculata Hirschmann, 1975
 Trachyuropoda athiasae Hirschmann, 1975
 Trachyuropoda auricularia Costa, 1962
 Trachyuropoda auricularis (Hull, 1923)
 Trachyuropoda baloghi Hirschmann, 1976
 Trachyuropoda baloghisimüis Hirschmann, 1976
 Trachyuropoda belunensis (Lombardini, 1962)
 Trachyuropoda berlesesellnickia Hirschmann, 1976
 Trachyuropoda boliviensis Hirschmann, 1976
 Trachyuropoda borinqueni Fox, 1957
 Trachyuropoda bostocki (Michael, 1894)
 Trachyuropoda canestriniana (Berlese, 1891)
 Trachyuropoda castrii Hirschmann, 1975
 Trachyuropoda céltica Halbert, 1907
 Trachyuropoda cistulata Hirschmann, 1975
 Trachyuropoda constricta Banks, 1916
 Trachyuropoda cristiceps (G. Canestrini, 1884)
 Trachyuropoda dacica Hutu, 1973
 Trachyuropoda dicarinata Hirschmann, 1976
 Trachyuropoda dicarinatasimilis Hirschmann, 1976
 Trachyuropoda dictyoeides Hirschmann, 1976
 Trachyuropoda difoveolata Hirschmann, 1975
 Trachyuropoda elegantula Trägårdh, 1952
 Trachyuropoda endrodyi Hirschmann, 1976
 Trachyuropoda excavata (Wasmann, 1899)
 Trachyuropoda festiva (Berlese, 1888)
 Trachyuropoda foliitricha Hirschmann, 1977
 Trachyuropoda ghanaensis Hirschmann, 1976
 Trachyuropoda gracilis Hirschmann, 1976
 Trachyuropoda graeca Sellnick, 1931
 Trachyuropoda hexaspinosa Hirschmann, 1976
 Trachyuropoda hirschmanni Pecina, 1980
 Trachyuropoda imitans Berlese, 1905
 Trachyuropoda imperforata Berlese, 1904
 Trachyuropoda kiewensis Hirschmann, 1976
 Trachyuropoda kinsella Kontschán, 2010
 Trachyuropoda lagrecai Lombardini, 1947
 Trachyuropoda leai Banks, 1916
 Trachyuropoda lindquisti Hirschmann, 1976
 Trachyuropoda longicornuta Hirschmann, 1976
 Trachyuropoda longicornutasimilis Hirschmann, 1976
 Trachyuropoda magna (Leonardi, 1895)
 Trachyuropoda mahunkai Hirschmann, 1976
 Trachyuropoda margaritaensis Hirschmann, 1979
 Trachyuropoda matsuurai Hiramatsu, 1980
 Trachyuropoda mesofovea Hirschmann, 1976
 Trachyuropoda mesofoveasimilis Hirschmann, 1976
 Trachyuropoda mexicana Hirschmann, 1976
 Trachyuropoda michaeli (Ewing, 1909)
 Trachyuropoda micherdzinskii Hirschmann, 1976
 Trachyuropoda multituberculata Hirschmann, 1976
 Trachyuropoda multituberosa (Willmann, 1951)
 Trachyuropoda myrmecophila Wisniewski & Hirschmann, 1992
 Trachyuropoda nicolae Hirschmann, 1976
 Trachyuropoda origmophora Hirschmann, 1976
 Trachyuropoda pecinai Hirschmann, 1976
 Trachyuropoda plagiata Hirschmann, 1976
 Trachyuropoda ponticuli Karg, 1989
 Trachyuropoda poppi Hirschmann & Zirngiebl-Nicol, 1969
 Trachyuropoda pseudoperforata Lombardini, 1947
 Trachyuropoda quadriauricularia Hirschmann, 1976
 Trachyuropoda quadricarinata Hirschmann, 1976
 Trachyuropoda quadricornuta Hirschmann, 1976
 Trachyuropoda ramitricha Hirschmann, 1977
 Trachyuropoda represa Hirschmann, 1976
 Trachyuropoda reticulata Hirschmann, 1976
 Trachyuropoda riccardiana (Leonardi, 1895)
 Trachyuropoda rufipes Hirschmann, 1976
 Trachyuropoda schusteri Hirschmann, 1976
 Trachyuropoda schusterisimilis Hirschmann, 1976
 Trachyuropoda sellnicki Hirschmann & Zirngiebl-Nicol, 1969
 Trachyuropoda septentrionalis Berlese, 1904
 Trachyuropoda similiarculata Hirschmann, 1975
 Trachyuropoda similiathiasae Hiramatsu, 1979
 Trachyuropoda similicoccinea Hiramatsu, 1979
 Trachyuropoda sinuata Berlese, 1904
 Trachyuropoda termitophila Trägårdh, 1906
 Trachyuropoda transversaria Hirschmann, 1976
 Trachyuropoda trinidadis Hirschmann, 1976
 Trachyuropoda troguloides (Gervais, 1844)
 Trachyuropoda tuberculata Berlese, 1913
 Trachyuropoda tuberculatotransversaria Hirschmann, 1976
 Trachyuropoda tuberosa Hirschmann, 1976
 Trachyuropoda vulgaris Hirschmann, 1976
 Trachyuropoda wasmanniana Berlese, 1903
 Trachyuropoda whitkombi Hirschmann, 1975
 Trachyuropoda willmanni Hirschmann & Zirngiebl-Nicol, 1969
 Trachyuropoda woelkei Hirschmann, 1976
 Trachyuropoda zicsii Hirschmann, 1976
 Urojanetia Berlese, 1917
 Urojanetia coccinea (Michael, 1891)
 Urojanetia stoechas (Athias-Binche, 1988)
 Urotrachys Berlese, 1903
 Urotrachys formicaria (Lubbock, 1881)
 Urotrachys formicariasimilis (Hirschmann, 1975)

References

Mesostigmata
Acari families